Phlegmariurus compactus is a species of plant in the family Lycopodiaceae. It is endemic to Ecuador, where it is distributed throughout the southern Andean páramos. It occurs up to 4500 meters in altitude.

References

compactus
Endemic flora of Ecuador
Vulnerable plants
Taxonomy articles created by Polbot
Taxobox binomials not recognized by IUCN